The 1993 MTV Video Music Awards aired live on September 2, 1993, honoring the best music videos from June 16, 1992, to June 15, 1993. The show was hosted by Christian Slater at the Universal Amphitheatre in Los Angeles.  This would be Kurt Cobain's final VMA appearance.

This year marked the introduction of yet another new category with the addition of Best R&B Video ballot. However, this would be the first time that a new award was added to the list of genre categories, a move that was mainly propelled by the success and popularity of MTV Jams.

The night's biggest winner was Pearl Jam, whose video for "Jeremy" earned four awards that night, including Video of the Year. Closely following were En Vogue with three Moonmen and Madonna and Peter Gabriel with two awards apiece. All other winners took one award each.

Meanwhile, in terms of nominations R&B group En Vogue and their video for "Free Your Mind" were the most nominated act and video (respectively) that night, receiving a total of eight nominations. The second most nominated artists of the night were Peter Gabriel, Aerosmith, and R.E.M., who received six nominations each. Gabriel split his six nominations evenly between his videos for "Digging in the Dirt" and "Steam," while all of R.E.M.'s nominations went to their video for "Man on the Moon." Lastly, Aerosmith, the winners of the Viewer's Choice award, received six nominations for their clip "Livin' on the Edge."

The show was also infamous for the on-stage pairing of drag queen RuPaul and comedian and TV legend Milton Berle. It was obvious from the beginning that the pair did not get along, and they traded harsh verbal barbs throughout their time on-stage. They reportedly continued their verbal sparring match backstage, with RuPaul commenting to Berle at one point, "You used to wear dresses, now you wear diapers!" RuPaul even claimed that Berle touched him inappropriately, and the entire event subsequently forced RuPaul to end what was, up until that point, a very prosperous professional relationship with MTV.

Background
MTV announced in late June that the 1993 Video Music Awards would be held on September 2 at the Universal Amphitheatre. MTV cited complaints from members of the music industry concerning staging, traffic problems, and overcrowding during the 1992 ceremony as reasons for not returning to the Pauley Pavilion. Nominees were announced at a press conference held on July 21. Christian Slater was announced as host on the same day. Over 25 television programs contributed to the nominations packages, which were inspired by U2's Zoo TV Tour, including Roseanne, Jeopardy!, and Murder, She Wrote. The venue was modified to permit scenery and set changes for performers including doubling the width of the proscenium and replacing the back wall with a video projection screen. Producer Joel Gallen noted that the ceremony would "definitely have more of a sense of humor than past shows." The ceremony broadcast was preceded by the 1993 MTV Video Music Awards Opening Act. Hosted by Kurt Loder and Tabitha Soren with reports from Cindy Crawford, John Norris, and Alison Stewart, the broadcast featured red carpet interviews, pre-taped interviews with Mariah Carey and Soul Asylum, and pre-taped features on a day with Lenny Kravitz and the Video of the Year nominees.

Performances

Presenters
 Michael Richards – presented Best Alternative Video
 Dr. Dre, Snoop Doggy Dogg and George Clinton – presented Best R&B Video
 Kennedy and John Norris – appeared in a backstage vignette about Viewer's Choice voting
 Peter Gabriel and Natalie Merchant – presented Best Group Video
 Lyle Lovett and Arrested Development – presented Best New Artist in a Video
 Dan Cortese, Bill Bellamy and Steven Tyler – appeared in a backstage vignette about Viewer's Choice voting
 Christian Slater (host) – introduced the winners of previously announced categories
 Shaquille O'Neal and Cindy Crawford – presented Best Dance Video
 Martin Lawrence – presented Best Rap Video
 Beavis and Butt-head – presented Best Metal/Hard Rock Video
 John Walsh – appeared in a video vignette about Viewer's Choice voting
 VJs Sophiya Haque (Asia), Simone Angel (Europe), Daisy Fuentes (Internacional) and Gastão Moreira (Brasil) – announced their respective region's Viewer's Choice winner
 Milton Berle and RuPaul – presented Viewer's Choice
 Sharon Stone – presented Best Direction in a Video
 Whoopi Goldberg – introduced The Edge
 Keanu Reeves – presented Best Female Video and Best Male Video
 Tony Bennett and the Red Hot Chili Peppers (Anthony Kiedis and Flea) – presented Video of the Year
 Heather DeLoach (as "Bee Girl") – tap-danced for the audience during the show's closing

Winners and nominations
Nominees were selected by approximately 200 individuals representing record labels, music journalism, music video production, radio, and film studios. Winners in all categories, except for the Viewer's Choice awards, were selected by over 700 members of the music industry.

Winners are in bold text.

References

External links
 Official MTV site

1993
MTV Video Music Awards
MTV Video Music Awards
1993 in Los Angeles